is a Japanese basketball player for Denso Iris and the Japanese national team.

She participated at the 2017 FIBA Women's Asia Cup.

References

1996 births
Living people
Japanese women's basketball players
Small forwards
Asian Games bronze medalists for Japan
Asian Games medalists in basketball
Medalists at the 2014 Asian Games
People from Nanao, Ishikawa
Basketball players at the 2014 Asian Games
21st-century Japanese women